Elaine Ullian was the president and CEO of Boston Medical Center from 1996 until January 2010, replaced by Kathleen E. Walsh.  Before that, she was President and Chief Executive Officer of Boston University Medical Center Hospital and Faulkner Hospital.  Ullian is a board member at Thermo Fisher Scientific.

At the time of her retirement, she was an associate professor at the Boston University School of Public Health, was on the faculty at the Harvard School of Public Health and was a member of the Boston Public Health Commission.

References

External links
Financially Troubled Hospital Gave CEO $3.5M Bonus

Boston University School of Public Health faculty
American women chief executives
American health care chief executives
Harvard School of Public Health faculty
Living people
Year of birth missing (living people)
American women academics
21st-century American women